Appetite is a monthly peer-reviewed scientific journal covering research on normal and disordered eating and drinking in animals and humans. The journal was established in 1980. It is published by Elsevier and the editor-in-chief is Professor Marion M Hetherington.

Abstracting and indexing
The journal is abstracted and indexed in:

According to the Journal Citation Reports, the journal has a 2021 impact factor of 5.016.

References

External links

Elsevier academic journals
Publications established in 1980
Monthly journals
Physiology journals
English-language journals
Psychology journals
Food science journals